James Richard McKissack (February 10, 1926 – August 28, 1982) was a professional American football player and later a politician. Born in San Antonio, Texas,  McKissack played college football for Southern Methodist University. He was drafted by the Los Angeles Rams in the 5th round (64th overall) of the 1950 NFL Draft. He played for one season (1952) at defensive back for the  Dallas Texans He later served in the Texas House of Representatives (1965-1973).

References

1926 births
American athlete-politicians
American football cornerbacks
SMU Mustangs football players
Dallas Texans (NFL) players
1982 deaths
People from Dallas
Players of American football from San Antonio
Players of American football from Dallas
Members of the Texas House of Representatives
20th-century American politicians